Louis Herman (born 10 October 1952) is a sailor from Chile, who represented his country at the 1984 Summer Olympics in Los Angeles, United States as helmsman in the Soling. With crew members Jorge Zvazola and Manuel Gonzalez they took the 18th place.

References

Living people
1952 births
Sailors at the 1984 Summer Olympics – Soling
Olympic sailors of Chile
Chilean male sailors (sport)